William Raymond Shadish Jr. (November 3, 1949 – March 27, 2016) was an American psychologist and statistician who was a distinguished professor and founding faculty member at the University of California, Merced. He was known for his work in the field of behavioral science, especially on the topics of program evaluation, causal inference, meta-analysis, and the study of methodology.

Early life and education
Shadish was born on November 3, 1949 in Brooklyn, New York, to William Shadish Sr. and Maryjane Cartmell. Shadish Jr.'s father was a Korean War veteran who spent 30 months as a prisoner of war in North Korea. Shadish Jr. was raised in Redding, California, and received his bachelor's degree in sociology from Santa Clara University in 1972. He went on to attend Purdue University, where he received his master's degree and Ph.D in Clinical Psychology in 1975 and 1978, respectively.

Career
After teaching at the University of Memphis for many years, Shadish joined the faculty of the University of California, Merced (UC-Merced) in 2003. There, he designed the psychology major at the then-brand-new university, which did not have any students or buildings when he first joined its faculty. He also led the process that created the Ph.D. in psychology program at UC-Merced. He became the second ever distinguished professor at UC-Merced, and received the Distinguished Research Award from their Academic Senate in 2011.

Affiliations with learned societies
Shadish was the founding secretary-treasurer of the Society for Research Synthesis Methodology, later serving as its president from 2013 to 2014. He was also elected president of the American Evaluation Association in 1996, and of the Society of Multivariate Experimental Psychology in 2014. He was a fellow of the American Psychological Association.

Awards
Shadish received the 1994 Paul F. Lazarsfeld Award for Evaluation Theory and the 2000 Robert Ingle Award from the American Evaluation Association. He also received two Outstanding Research Publication Awards (in 1994 and 1996) from the American Association for Marriage and Family Therapy, the 2002 Donald T. Campbell Award for Innovations in Methodology from the Policy Studies Organization, and the 2009 Frederick Mosteller Award for Lifetime Contributions to Systematic Reviews from the Campbell Collaboration.

Death
Shadish died at his home in Mariposa, California on March 27, 2016, of complications from prostate cancer.

References

External links
Faculty page

Issue of the American Journal of Evaluation containing a section in Shadish's memory

1949 births
2016 deaths
Deaths from prostate cancer
20th-century American psychologists
American statisticians
University of California, Merced faculty
People from Brooklyn
Santa Clara University alumni
People from Redding, California
Purdue University alumni
University of Memphis faculty
Fellows of the American Psychological Association
Deaths from cancer in California
Mathematicians from New York (state)
Quantitative psychologists